Yaghdan, is a village in the Lori Province of Armenia. It has a majority of Greeks.

References 

Populated places in Lori Province